Gyueshevo (also transliterated Gjueshevo, Guieshevo, Gjueševo) is a village in Kyustendil Municipality, Kyustendil Province, in western Bulgaria.  the population is 275 and the mayor is Stoyne Maksimov. The village is located on the border with North Macedonia and is the most important of the three border checkpoints between the two countries. It is the last stop of the railway from Sofia. This railway is intended to link the capital to Skopje, but the Macedonian section of the line has not been built. The local railway station was built in 1910, while the first school dates to 1888. The Prosveta community centre (chitalishte) was opened in 1921. There is also a church mausoleum dedicated to the perished Bulgarian soldiers in the Balkan Wars and the First World War. Gyueshevo was first mentioned in 1570 as Gyuveshevo. The name is thought to originate from the personal name Gyuesh, probably a derivative of George; –esh is a rare personal name suffix used in names such as Dobresh, Malesh or Radesh.

Gallery

References

Villages in Kyustendil Province
Bulgaria–North Macedonia border crossings